Setting Fires may refer to:

 Setting Fires, a collaboration project by Mat Devine and Alain Whyte
 "Setting Fires" (song), a 2016 single by The Chainsmokers